A tontine is an investment plan for raising capital, devised in the 17th century.

Tontine may also refer to:

 Tontine Building, in Vermont, USA
 Tontine Buildings, Stourport, in Worcestershire, England
 Tontine (card game), an historical French gambling and card game
 Tontine (horse), a 19th century British racehorse
 Tontine Coffee House
 Tontine Group, Australian pillow manufacturer
 Tontine Park, former football ground in Scotland
 Tontine Trust, digital pensions company

See also
 Tonti (disambiguation)